Litai usually refers to Lithuanian litas (plural litai).

Litai may also refer to:
Litae, daughters of Zeus in Greek mythology
Litai, Shandong, a town in Yanggu County, Shandong, China
Litai Township, a township in Xianyang, Shaanxi, China